Ibrahima Ndiaye (born 11 March 1985 in Dakar) is a Qatari footballer, who currently plays .

Career
Ndiaye began his career in the youth team of RC Lens and was in summer 2003 signed by Qatari club Umm-Salal Sports Club. The midfielder joined after a half year with Al Rayyan SC in January 2011 to Al-Khor Sports Club.

International career
He is a member of the Qatar national football team.

Notes

Living people
Umm Salal SC players
1983 births
Senegalese emigrants to Qatar
Qatar Stars League players
Qatari footballers
Qatar international footballers
Al-Rayyan SC players
Al-Khor SC players
Al-Shahania SC players
Al-Shamal SC players
Expatriate footballers in France
RC Lens players
Naturalised citizens of Qatar
Qatari people of Senegalese descent
Qatari Second Division players
Association football midfielders